Cosmosoma nigricornis is a moth of the subfamily Arctiinae. It was described by Johan Christian Fabricius in 1787. It is found in Colombia.

References

nigricornis
Moths described in 1787